is a Japanese advertising entrepreneur, primarily active in the area of unconventional advertising campaigns.

Business career
Takamatsu received a Bachelor of Science in solid-state physics from the University of Tsukuba in 1983, working for Japanese advertising company Dentsu from 1983 – 2005. In 2005 he started his own advertising firm, Ground. He is also founder and CEO of production company Space Films and space travel agency Space Travel, the Japanese partner of space tourism company Space Adventures.

Space tourist
In January 2015 Takamatsu began training as an International Space Station spaceflight participant. Initially he was training to be the backup for the September 2015 Sarah Brightman Soyuz TMA-18M/Soyuz TMA-16M flight. On May 13, 2015, Brightman announced she had withdrawn from training, making Takamatsu part of the main crew. Takamatsu declined to take up the option of flying on that flight, as he had planned to carry out art projects while in space, and they would not be ready by the September date. Instead, he would schedule a later flight, after the projects were ready.

Takamatsu was replaced on Soyuz TMA-18M by Kazakh cosmonaut Aidyn Aimbetov, from the first Kazakhstan cosmonaut class, the first Kazakhstani cosmonaut selected to fly. Takamatsu's flight has been postponed from 2017 and is currently scheduled to take place in 2020.

As of end of 2021, Takamatsu has not participated in any space flight.

References 

Businesspeople in advertising
Japanese business executives
1963 births
Living people
20th-century Japanese businesspeople
21st-century Japanese businesspeople
University of Tsukuba alumni